Milajerd (also Romanized as Mīlājerd and Mīlājord) is a village in Karkas Rural District, in the Central District of Natanz County, Isfahan Province, Iran. At the 2006 census, its population was 285, in 84 families.

References 

Populated places in Natanz County